Palmetto Tennis Center (PTC) is a National Tennis Court in Palmetto Park in Sumter, South Carolina. It is the largest tennis center in the state.  

PTC has  18 lit hard courts as well as six  Deco-Turf courts.  It hosts several tournaments every year both junior and adult.  PTC is also the host of the Palmetto Pro Open a women's 25K event on the USTA Pro Circuit.

External links
Map: 

Tennis venues in the United States
Sports venues in Sumter County, South Carolina